Duke of Salerno is a Spanish-Duosicilian royal title that was created in 1937 in the defunct Peerage of the Two Sicilies by Infante Alfonso, heir to the throne of the Two Sicilies, for his newborn heir presumptive child, Princess Teresa María. The title makes reference to the city of Salerno, in the former Kingdom of the Two Sicilies.

The heir apparent is the eldest child of Princess Teresa and his husband Iñigo Moreno, 1st Marquess of Laserna (formerly 11th Marquess of Laula), Rodrigo Moreno y Borbón-Dos Sicilias (born 1 February 1962) who remains childless, and so the heir presumptive is her second child, Alicia, who is married to José Luis Hernández Eraso, with two children:

Iñigo Hernández y Moreno (born 2000). Third in line to the Dukedom.
Alejandra Hernández y Moreno (born 2000). Fourth in line to the Dukedom.

Dukes of Salerno
1937-present Princess Teresa María

See also
Duke of Syracuse
List of dukes in the nobility of Italy

References

Salerno